Bebop & Beyond is a jazz tribute bebop ensemble led by saxophonist Mel Martin.

Bebop and Beyond features Martin, George Cables, Warren Gale, John Handy, Eddie Marshall, Frank Tusa.

Plays Dizzy Gillespie features Martin, Vince Lateano, George Cables, Donald Bailey and Gillespie himself.

Discography
Bebop and Beyond (1983, Concord Jazz)
Plays Thelonious Monk (1990, Bluemoon Records)
Plays Dizzy Gillespie (1991, Bluemoon)

References

External links
Plays Dizzy Gillespie at discogs

Bebop ensembles
American jazz ensembles